Herman Diederik Tjeenk Willink  (born 23 January 1942) is a retired Dutch politician of the Labour Party (PvdA) and jurist. He was granted the honorary title of Minister of State on 21 December 2012.

Tjeenk Willink served as a Member of the Senate from 23 June 1987 until 11 March 1997 and served as President of the Senate from 11 June 1991 until 11 March 1997. He resigned both positions when he was selected as the Vice-President of the Council of State taking office on 1 July 1997 and therefore the most important advisor to Queen Beatrix during that time.

Decorations

Honorary degrees

References

External links

Official
  Mr.Dr. H.D. (Herman) Tjeenk Willink Parlement & Politiek
  Mr.Dr. H.D. Tjeenk Willink (PvdA) Eerste Kamer der Staten-Generaal

1942 births
Living people
Businesspeople from Amsterdam
20th-century Dutch judges
Dutch corporate directors
Dutch nonprofit directors
Erasmus University Rotterdam alumni
Gay academics
Gay politicians
Knights Grand Cross of the Order of Orange-Nassau
Labour Party (Netherlands) politicians
Leiden University alumni
Academic staff of Leiden University
Dutch LGBT businesspeople
LGBT judges
LGBT members of the Parliament of the Netherlands
Members of the Council of State (Netherlands)
Members of the Senate (Netherlands)
Ministers of State (Netherlands)
Presidents of the Senate (Netherlands)
Politicians from Amsterdam
Academic staff of Tilburg University
Recipients of the Order of the House of Orange
Vice-presidents of the Council of State (Netherlands)
University of Amsterdam alumni
University of Paris alumni
20th-century Dutch businesspeople
20th-century Dutch civil servants
20th-century Dutch educators
20th-century Dutch politicians
21st-century Dutch politicians